Marcelus dos Santos (born 9 February 1973) is a Brazilian rower. He competed in the men's double sculls event at the 1996 Summer Olympics.

References

External links
 

1973 births
Living people
Brazilian male rowers
Olympic rowers of Brazil
Rowers at the 1996 Summer Olympics
People from Pelotas
Pan American Games medalists in rowing
Pan American Games silver medalists for Brazil
Pan American Games bronze medalists for Brazil
Rowers at the 1995 Pan American Games
Rowers at the 2003 Pan American Games
Rowers at the 2007 Pan American Games
Medalists at the 2003 Pan American Games
Medalists at the 2007 Pan American Games
Sportspeople from Rio Grande do Sul